CNN Philippines Cebuano News was the flagship Cebuano-language newscast of CNN Philippines. It aired weekdays at 1:00 p.m. before Kapampangan News. It was the first regional newscast produced by CNN Philippines that premiered under its predecessor Solar News Channel and the first national newscast in Cebuano aired nationwide.

Background

As Solar News Cebuano

The newscast was first known as Solar News Cebuano, an innovative program by Solar News Channel to deliver its trademark newsgathering into Cebuano language, the second widely spoken language in the Philippines. Solar News Cebuano was launched on January 28, 2013 and was first anchored by Menchu Macapagal.

Cebuano News
The newscast was then rebranded into Cebuano News on July 21, 2014 upon the impending acquisition of Solar Television Network to the ALC Group of Companies a month later, with a new titlecard and graphic introduced on August 25, 2014 following channel's rebrand to 9TV. The current incarnation was launched on March 16, 2015 in lieu with the launch of CNN Philippines along with a CNN-themed graphics and a revamped news studio.

Prior to its current incarnation, the text in the lower third of the screen and most of its graphics used the Cebuano language. However, the text was switched to the English language several weeks before the launch of CNN Philippines.

On February 15, 2016, Cebuano News and Kapampangan News reduced their timeslot from their half-hour running time to 15 minutes.

On March 18, 2016, Menchu Macapagal anchored her final newscast on Cebuano News as she was relegated to a regular correspondent but remained anchor of Traffic Center on the afternoons (until her departure on the network on end of October 2016). She was replaced by her relief anchor Jun Tariman, doubling his duty as executive producer of the program. Macapagal, prior to her reassignment had been heavily criticized by viewers due to her notoriety as a former disc jockey.

Cancellation
Cebuano News was quietly axed by the network on March 31, 2017. The cancellation has been lengthily planned by the network partly due to the continuing revamps under Armie Jarin-Bennett and partly due to mounting viewer complaints of both Cebuano and Kapampangan News not limited to be carried by CNN PH's regional stations. A simulcast of CNN Newsroom's 1 AM EDT/12 MN EST slot with Cyril Vanier and Natalie Allen (Monday) and John Vause and Isha Sesay (Tuesday to Friday) replaced both regional newscasts and the 1:30 pm current affairs filler slot on April 3, 2017.

Staff
Anchor
 Jun Tariman

Stringers
Dale G. Israel
Ben Tesiorna
Erwin Cabilbigan
Liza Jocson

Substitute anchor(s)
 Amelyn Veloso (deceased)
 Hillary Isaac

Former anchor
 Menchu Macapagal (2013-2016)

References

2013 Philippine television series debuts
2017 Philippine television series endings
CNN Philippines original programming